David Cournapeau is a data scientist. He is the original author of the  scikit-learn package, an open source machine learning library in the Python programming language.

Early life and education 
Cournapeau graduated with a MSc in Electrical Engineering from Telecom Paristech, Paris in 2004, and obtained his PhD in Computer Science at Kyoto University, Japan, in the domain of speech recognition.

Career 
The scikit-learn project started as scikits.learn, a Google Summer of Code project by David Cournapeau.
After having worked for Silveregg, a SaaS Japanese company delivering recommendation systems for Japanese online retailers, he worked for 6 years at Enthought, a scientific consulting company. He joined Cogent Labs, a Japanese Deep Learning/AI company, in 2017. He is a Machine Learning Engineering Manager at Mercari, Inc.

Cournapeau has also been involved in the development of other central numerical Python libraries:
NumPy and SciPy.

References 

Kyoto University alumni
Living people
Year of birth missing (living people)
Place of birth missing (living people)
Data scientists
Télécom Paris alumni